, also known as the , is a Western-style residence in Bunkyō, Tokyo commissioned in 1924 by Ichirō Hatoyama, and it was here that he helped form the present Liberal Democratic Party.  The house and gardens are in the process of evolving into a museum commemorating the Hatoyama family's contributions to politics and education in Japan.

The building's architect was Okada Shin'ichi, who also designed the Kabuki-za. The facade is composed of three bays in natural stone, with large French windows on the ground floor. On the first floor, the windows and doors fill the entire width of the building; the doors open inwards and there are narrow, French-style balconies.

There are currently three memorial rooms open to the public, one dedicated to Ichiro, another to his wife Kaoru, and yet another to their son, Iichiro Hatoyama. In addition, the garden features sculptures of Kazuo Hatoyama and his wife, Haruko.

Hatoyama public figures
The Hatoyamas have been active participants in Japanese public life, including:

1st generation
 Kazuo Hatoyama (1856 – 1911): Vice-Foreign Minister, speaker of the House of Representatives of the Diet of Japan from 1896 – 1897, University of Tokyo professor,  former principal of Waseda University (1890 – 1907), father of Ichirō Hatoyama, and great-grandfather of Yukio Hatoyama and Kunio Hatoyama.
 Haruko Hatoyama (1863 – 1938): Japanese educator, co-founder of what is today Kyoritsu Women's University, mother of Ichirō Hatoyama, and great-grandmother of Yukio Hatoyama and Kunio Hatoyama.

2nd generation
 Ichirō Hatoyama (1883 – 1959): Secretary of the Cabinet, Minister of Education and 52nd, 53rd and 54th Prime Minister of Japan, son of Kazuo and Haruko, father of Iichirō, and grandfather of Yukio Hatoyama and Kunio Hatayama.
 Kaoru Hatoyama (1888 – 1982): schoolmaster of Kyoritsu Women's University; wife of Ichirō, mother of Iichirō

3rd generation
 Iichirō Hatoyama (1918 – 1993): Foreign Minister of Japan in 1976 – 1977, grandson of Kazuo and Haruko, eldest son of Ichirō Hatoyama and father of Yukio Hatoyama and Kunio Hatayama.
 Yasuko Hatoyama (1922 – 2013): wife of Iichirō, mother of Kazuko, Yukio and Kunio

4th generation
 Yukio Hatoyama (1947 –  ): Prime Minister of Japan, leader of the Democratic Party of Japan, great-grandson of Kazuo and Haruko, grandson of Ichirō and Kaoru, son of Iichirō and Yasuko, and older brother of Kunio. 
 Miyuki Hatoyama (1943 – ), wife of Yukio.
 Kunio Hatoyama (1948 – 2016): Japanese politician, former Minister of Internal Affairs and Communications, (Liberal Democratic Party), former Minister of Education, Labour, and Justice, great-grandson of Kazuo and Haruko, grandson of Ichirō and Kaoru, son of Iichirō and Yasuko, and younger brother of Yukio.

5th generation
 Tarō Hatoyama (1974 –  ): Japanese politician, former member of the Tokyo Metropolitan Assembly and New Renaissance Party candidate in the 2010 Japanese House of Councillors election, great-great-grandson of Kazuo and Haruko, great-grandson of Ichirō and Kaoru, grandson of Iichirō, eldest son of Kunio and Emily, and nephew of Yukio.

Notes

References
 Itoh, Mayumi. (2003). The Hatoyama Dynasty: Japanese Political Leadership through the Generations, New York: Palgrave Macmillan. ;

External links

  Hatoyama Hall official website 
  鳩山会館/旧鳩山一郎邸 (Hatoyama Hall)

Buildings and structures in Bunkyō
Gardens in Tokyo
Hatoyama family
Museums in Tokyo
Biographical museums in Japan